Olfa Charni (born 24 May 1980) is a pistol shooter from Tunisia. She won the individual 10 meter air pistol and 25 meter pistol at the 2011 Pan Arab Games and 2011 and 2015 African Championships, and qualified for the 2016 Summer Olympics in these events.

She competed at the 2020 Summer Olympics.

References

External links

Living people
1980 births
Tunisian female sport shooters
Olympic shooters of Tunisia
Shooters at the 2016 Summer Olympics
Shooters at the 2020 Summer Olympics
21st-century Tunisian women